The Bathurst Island Formation is a geologic formation in Nunavut. It preserves fossils dating back to the Devonian period.

See also

 List of fossiliferous stratigraphic units in Nunavut

References
 

Devonian Nunavut
Silurian northern paleotropical deposits
Devonian southern paleotropical deposits